The Office of the Leader of the House of Lords (OLHL) is a ministerial department of the Cabinet Office with the duty of providing support to the Leader of the House of Lords, currently Lord True. Duties include assisting the leader in providing information, as well as answering questions from members of the House of Lords and the British Government.

The deputy leader also provides support for the office including questioning government ministers and working on legislation debated by the house. The deputy leader is not a cabinet level minister. It also supports the Lords Whip's Office.

Current Office

Whips Office

See also
Cabinet of the United Kingdom
Office of the Leader of the House of Commons
Representative of the Government in the Senate (Canada)

References

External links

Ministerial departments of the Government of the United Kingdom
Westminster system
1721 establishments in Great Britain